The State of Vermont has the highest number of covered bridges per square mile in the United States. Replica covered bridges have also been built throughout the state to capture the essence of the historic bridges.  Non-authentic covered bridges are those that do not use traditional truss construction.  Usually they are built with stringer construction.  This list is bound to be incomplete as "backyard bridges", as most of these can be, are not publicized.

Bridge access by the public
The "access" column indicates whether the bridge is publicly accessible or not.

 Public bridges: There are some bridges in this list that are truly public... bridges at parks, etc.  Other bridges that are technically privately owned, but on property generally open to the public (condominium projects, hotels, stores, etc.) are also listed as "public".  It can be assumed that easy access to these bridges without trespassing is possible.
 Private bridges: Bridges that are definitely privately owned and not open to the public are marked as "private", despite whether or not visitors are welcomed.  In the case of these bridges, it is noted (when known) whether they can be seen or accessed from public land (a road) without trespassing.

GPS coordinates
Longitude and latitude coordinates are given when confirmed either by personal observation or satellite imagery.

The list

Destroyed by Hurricane Irene 
The following bridges were destroyed by Hurricane Irene on August 28, 2011 and removed from this list:
 Giorgetti Covered Bridge formerly in Pittsfield
 Toll Covered Bridge formerly in Dover
 Pickle Barrel Covered Bridge formerly in Sherburne
 Spring Hill Farm Covered Bridge formerly in Barnard
 Seven Cedars Farm formerly in Barnard ( Visited by Dan Brock )

The Giorgetti and Pickle Barrel covered bridges were not destroyed by Hurricane Irene. They still stand today. Source is my visiting these sites after Hurricane Irene.  By Dan Brock

Other losses 
 The Hayes Covered Bridge formerly in Brookline was removed due to rot in November 2010 and removed from this list.
 The Deer Park Covered Bridge formerly in Bennington is reportedly gone and was removed from this list.

See also

 List of covered bridges in Vermont
 List of bridges on the National Register of Historic Places in Vermont
 List of Vermont-related topics

Covered bridges, Non-authentic
 
Lists of covered bridges in the United States
Bridges, covered, non-authentic